Daniel Frazer Bennett (born 22 August 1976 in Dewsbury, England) is an English-born South African football referee. He was voted PSL Referee of the Season in 2000–01 and 2010–11 and has been an international referee since 2003.

Career
Bennett is a teacher at Mondeor Primary School in Johannesburg.

International
Bennett missed the 2014 FIFA World Cup due to injury.

In June 2019, Bennett announced he would retire from international refereeing at the end of 2019.

References

1976 births
Living people
South African soccer referees
South African people of English descent
Sportspeople from Johannesburg
South African schoolteachers
Sportspeople from Dewsbury
20th-century South African educators
21st-century South African educators